Lecithocera perrierella is a moth in the family Lecithoceridae. It was described by Viette in 1985. It is found in Africa.

References

Moths described in 1985
perrierella
Moths of Africa